Bordier & Cie is a Swiss private banker founded in 1844 in Geneva and active in wealth management for private clients. It is the last French-speaking private banker in Switzerland, headed by three partners with unlimited responsibility on their own assets. The institution holds a banking license in Switzerland, Turks and Caicos Islands and Singapore and has branches in the United Kingdom, France and Uruguay.

History

The Bordier bank was founded in 1844 when Jaques Reverdin, who was previously employed at the Pictet bank, started the company to become a banker in Geneva. In 1871, Reverdin's son-in-law Ami Bordier joined the company as a business broker. Upon Reverdin's death in 1895 the management of the bank was given to Bordier and the institution was renamed Bordier & Cie.

Ami Bordier was joined by his two sons, Pierre and Édouard, in 1897 and 1904 respectively. In 1906, the institution relocated to number 16 rue de Hollande in Geneva, where its headquarters are located today. In 1917, Ami Bordier retired and his sons became the bank's managers. Guillaume and Jacques Bordier, Pierre's sons, became partners in 1936 and Raymond, Pierre's third son, and Edmond Bordier, Édouard's only son, joined in 1938. In 1966, Philippe Bordier, Jacques’ oldest son, and André Bordier, Guillaume's son, joined the bank as partners and in 1974 they were at the head of the bank.

In 1975 the bank used an IBM system to computerize and automate their banking system. The bank later adopter the Olympic software at the end of the 1980s, which allowed staff to manage clients’ accounts online.

In 1992, Pierre Poncet became a partner, the first time someone outside of the Bordier family occupied this position. Gaétan Bordier joined the bank in 1994, becoming the fifth generation to join the institution. Grégoire and Evrard, also from the fifth generation, joined as unlimited partners in 1997 and 2011, respectively. In 2012 Michel Juvet replaced Pierre Poncet as managing partner with unlimited liability. 

In 2020, the Bordier bank changed its legal status to a partnership limited by shares. The institution maintained its status of “private banker”, the last in Romandie and thus the only French-speaking bank in Switzerland to maintain this particular structure with unlimited liability on the managing partners' private assets.

Operations

Bordier & Cie is headquartered in Geneva with branch offices in Nyon, Bern and Zurich. Outside of Switzerland it has branches in Paris, Brest, Rennes, London, Providenciales in the Turks and Caicos Islands, Montevideo in Uruguay and Singapore. It is a member of the Swiss Private Bankers Association.

Bordier & Cie operates as private bankers. Their services focus on wealth management including tax advice, financial planning, and family services, with approximately CHF 14.2 bn in assets under management at the end of 2020. Bordier & Cie has created in 2015 Bordier FinLab SA. Bordier FinLab purpose is investments in various asset classes.
Based on distinctive investment criteria, Bordier FinLab's approach is in particular geared towards using seeding and/or capital acceleration to invest in products undergoing development. Bordier FinLab SA works with a limited number of established financial partners (including banks, MFOs & IAMs). Lastly, Bordier FinLab provides technology intelligence on trends and developments affecting the banking industry (Fintech, Blockchain, etc.) and could be used as an incubator for the Bordier Group where appropriate.

Subsidiaries and partnerships

In 2001 Bordier & Cie acquired a 45% share of Berry Asset Management, a private management firm in the United Kingdom. It became a majority shareholder in 2007 when it increased its share to 90% of the company. In 2007 the company expanded in to Uruguay and in 2018 purchased Helvetia Advisors, a consultancy firm. The bank opened in Paris in 2006 under the Bordier & Cie (France) S.A. subsidiary and opened regional offices in Brest and Rennes in 2017.

Bordier & Cie opened a branch in Singapore in 2011. The bank partnered with Military Commercial Joint Stock Bank in Vietnam in 2018 and they created a joint venture in 2020.

Leadership

Managing Partners with unlimited personal liability 

Grégoire Bordier
Evrard Bordier
Christian Skaanild

Limited Partners 

Michel Juvet
Patrice Lagnaux
Alessandro Caldana

References

Private banks
Banks established in 1844
Banks of Switzerland
Swiss companies established in 1844